Gillard ministry may refer to:

 First Gillard ministry
 Second Gillard ministry